Raymond Glen Smith (March 19, 1931 – March 30, 1999) was a Canadian ice hockey player who played two games in the National Hockey League.  He played with the Chicago Black Hawks.
He is the most recent player listed by the NHL (1950-51) to wear the number 1 while not playing the position of goalie.

References

External links

1931 births
1999 deaths
Canadian ice hockey right wingers
Chicago Blackhawks players
Ice hockey people from Saskatchewan